Wilson Antonio Valdez (born May 20, 1978) is a Dominican former professional baseball infielder.

Playing career

Early career
Valdez was signed as an undrafted free agent by the Montreal Expos on February 4, 1997. He played on the Expos' Dominican League teams from 1997- and then on various minor league Single-A teams for the Expos through .

On March 29, 2002, he was claimed off waivers by the Florida Marlins and sent to the Marlins' Double-A team in Portland.

Chicago White Sox
On June 17, 2004, while hitting .319 for Albuquerque, he was traded by the Marlins with cash to the Chicago White Sox in exchange for reliever Billy Koch. On September 26, 2004, he hit his first career home run off Brian Anderson. In limited action he hit .233 for the Sox.

Seattle Mariners to San Diego Padres
After the season, he was waived by the White Sox and claimed by the Seattle Mariners. He started the  season as the starting shortstop for the Mariners. However, he hit only .198 and was traded to the San Diego Padres on June 9, 2005. After a stint with the Padres' Triple-A team in Portland, he returned to the major leagues with the Padres, hitting .231 in August as a utility player.

Los Angeles Dodgers
After the 2005 season, he was released by the Padres and signed to a minor league contract by the Kansas City Royals, who promptly traded him to the Los Angeles Dodgers during spring training.

On April 29, 2007, he scored the game-winning run in a game against the San Diego Padres that lasted 17 innings. He spent the  season with the Dodgers' Triple-A team, the Las Vegas 51s, where he hit .297 and stole 26 bases.

Japan
In , a spring-training injury to the Dodgers' starting shortstop Rafael Furcal created an opening-day roster spot for Valdez and he got plenty of playing time early for the Dodgers. After a quick start, however, he quickly cooled and was returned to the 51s. On January 3, 2008, Valdez's contract was sold to the Kia Tigers of the Korea Baseball Organization. On June 9, he signed with the Tokyo Yakult Swallows of Japan's Nippon Professional Baseball.

New York Mets
In December 2008, Valdez signed a minor league contract with the Cleveland Indians. On May 26, 2009, he was traded to the New York Mets and was added to the major league roster. On June 22, 2009, he was designated for assignment.

Philadelphia Phillies
On November 25, 2009, Valdez signed a minor league contract with the Philadelphia Phillies and was optioned to the Triple-A Lehigh Valley IronPigs. The Phillies selected his contract from the minors on April 14, 2010, as a reserve infielder, when Jimmy Rollins went on the disabled list. When backup Juan Castro was injured, Valdez became the Phillies' starting shortstop for a few weeks in the beginning of the season. On May 17, Rollins was activated from the disabled list (DL) and the Phillies designated Valdez for assignment, but re-activated him five days later when Rollins returned to the DL. In addition to playing shortstop, Valdez filled in at second base for Chase Utley while he was on the disabled list with a hand injury.

On July 29, in a game against the Arizona Diamondbacks, Valdez hit a one-out, walk-off single to score Cody Ransom from second base and give the Phillies a 3-2 win.

In 2010, Valdez set career highs in games, at bats, runs, hits, total bases, doubles, triples, home runs, runs batted in, bases on balls, intentional base on balls, strike outs, stolen bases, slugging percentage and on-base plus slugging percentage (OPS).

In a game started against the Cincinnati Reds on May 25, 2011, (which did not conclude until May 26), Valdez switched from second base to pitcher in the 19th inning, pitching one inning and allowing no runs. This was the first time he had ever pitched in a major league game.  When the Phillies won in the bottom of the 19th inning, he was credited with the win.  Valdez thus became the first position player to earn a win since catcher Brent Mayne won a game for the Colorado Rockies in 2000, and just the second since 1968. According to Elias Sports Bureau, Valdez was the first player to start a game in the field and end up as the winning pitcher since Babe Ruth did so on October 1, . The next and thus far most recent position player to record a win was Chris Davis, who did so in the 2012 season, although he did not start in the field, having been the starting designated hitter instead.

Cincinnati Reds
On January 25, 2012, Valdez was traded to the Cincinnati Reds in exchange for left handed pitcher Jeremy Horst. In 77 games with the Reds, Valdez hit .206/.236/.227 with 15 RBI and 3 stolen bases. He made 44 starts, 27 at shortstop. On November 8, Valdez elected free agency.

San Francisco Giants
He signed a minor league contract with the San Francisco Giants in December 2012.

Miami Marlins
On March 23, 2013, he signed a minor league contract with the Miami Marlins with an invitation to spring training.

Camden Riversharks
On May 25, 2013, he signed a contract with the Camden Riversharks of the Atlantic League.

York Revolution
On February 21, 2014, he signed a contract with the York Revolution of the Atlantic League. He became a free agent after the 2015 season.

References

Further reading

External links

1978 births
Albuquerque Isotopes players
Buffalo Bisons (minor league) players
Camden Riversharks players
Cape Fear Crocs players
Carolina Mudcats players
Charlotte Knights players
Chicago White Sox players
Cincinnati Reds players
Clinton LumberKings players
Columbus Clippers players
Dominican Republic expatriate baseball players in Japan
Dominican Republic expatriate baseball players in South Korea
Dominican Republic expatriate baseball players in the United States
Gigantes del Cibao players
Gulf Coast Expos players
Jupiter Hammerheads players
KBO League infielders
Kia Tigers players
Las Vegas 51s players

Lehigh Valley IronPigs players
Living people
Los Angeles Dodgers players
Major League Baseball second basemen
Major League Baseball shortstops
Major League Baseball third basemen
Major League Baseball players from the Dominican Republic
New Orleans Zephyrs players
New York Mets players
Nippon Professional Baseball infielders
People from Nizao
Philadelphia Phillies players
Portland Beavers players
Portland Sea Dogs players
San Diego Padres players
Seattle Mariners players
Tacoma Rainiers players
Tigres del Licey players
Tokyo Yakult Swallows players
Vermont Expos players
York Revolution players